Brewing equipment is the vessels and tools used to brew beer, which usually includes systems of saccharification, fermentation, refrigeration and clean-in-place.  

Archaeologists  uncovered ancient beer brewing equipment in an underground room built between 3400 and 2900 BC in China.  A research report published in the Proceedings of the National Academy of Sciences of the United States of America said that the Mijiaya Site provided the earliest evidence of beer-making in China,  indicating that people had mastered the beer brewing technology around 5,000 years ago.

In recent years, the concentration of the beer brewing equipment industry in the international market has been increasing, and the global manufacturing capacity of beer brewing equipment manufacturing is mainly concentrated in the Europe and Asia.  Examples of manufacturers of beer brewing equipment are BrewJacket,  and American Beer Equipment.

References

Brewing
Equipment
Machines